The reclamation of Wellington Harbour started in the 1850s, in order to increase the amount of usable land for the then new City of Wellington. Land plots in the early city were scarce, with little room for public buildings and parks, as well as inadequate dockside areas for shipping. Reclamation progressively advanced into the harbour throughout the 19th and 20th centuries, providing room for public, commercial and industrial areas for the city. Large reclamations were made in the 1960s and '70s to meet the demands of container shipping and new cargo handling methods. For over 100 years, development was largely overseen by the Wellington Harbour Board, formed in 1880. Following the neoliberal reforms of the Fourth Labour Government, authority was transferred to the Wellington City Council. Since then, the formerly industrial waterfront has been converted into office space and public areas.  Reclamation has added more than 155 hectares to Wellington.

Location of Wellington

A plan for the New Zealand Company's new settlement of Britannia at Pito-one (Petone) had been prepared in England by Samuel Cobham. The key elements of his city were a large amount of flat land on the shores of a harbour, traversable by a navigable river. When surveyors arrived in 1840 on the Cuba led by Captain William Mein Smith, it was determined that the Hutt River was not navigable and, due to its tendency to flood, was not appropriate to support a major city. For these reasons the new settlement was relocated to the southern shores of Port Nicholson and renamed Wellington.

Edward Gibbon Wakefield of the New Zealand Company had devised a system of "packages" of land for colonists of one town acre each. Cobham's Brittania consisted of 1100  town sections, which William Mein Smith struggled to fit into the new location. These sections were squeezed into the available space by sacrificing many of the planned amenities such as parks, reserves, ports, libraries and many other public areas identified in the original plan. For this reason, from Wellington's outset, there was a need for extra land.

19th-century reclamations and the establishment of the Wellington Harbour Board

While large scale reclamation began in the 1850s, the earliest reclamations in Wellington were conducted by private citizens. A popular story of the first reclamation conducted in Wellington was that done by George Bennet. Bennet had arrived in 1848 on the Berenicia and purchased a hilly section at Windy, or Clay Point (what is now the corner of Lambton Quay and Willis Street). At that time, Windy Point was a precipice with a narrow and often impassible path connecting Willis Street to Beach Road (now Lambton Quay). Bennet commenced, to the amusement of neighbours, with pick-axe, shovel and barrow to move earth from the Point, tossing the spoil onto the path and into the harbour, thus widened the track and performing Wellington's first reclamation.

A programme of systematic reclamation began in 1852, overseen by the provincial government. Charles Carter completed a 360' x 100' extension below Willis Street at a cost of £1,036.

In 1855, the magnitude 8.2 Wairarapa earthquake uplifted the northwestern side of Wellington bay (in some places up to 1.5 metres). This created a tidal swamp, and rendered many of the existing jetties in the harbour unusable. Most of this land was subsequently reclaimed, providing an excellent new rail and road route to the north. Another result of the newly raised land in Wellington was that the shipping basin planned for the city was abandoned and the land used for a cricket ground, the Basin Reserve.
 

In 1880, the Wellington Harbour Board was established to manage and develop the harbour and its facilities. From then reclamation work was divided between the Harbour Board, the Government and the City Council. Among major developments from 1880 to the turn of the century was the reclamation north of Pipitea Point for railways land and south of Queens Wharf to Te Aro by the City Council. This removed the last vestiges of private ownership of the foreshore, putting the waterfront under the control of the Harbour Board.

By the end of the 19th century, the original 1840 shoreline was unrecognisable.

Twentieth century reclamations

From 1900 to 1930 further reclamations were made for railways and Harbour Board purposes. Additional wharves and the seawall at Oriental Bay were built, and the boat harbour at Clyde Quay was constructed.

1960s and container shipping

The final phase of reclamation took place in the 1960s and 1970s. A government report in 1967 recommended the adoption of containerisation and that Wellington should be one of the two New Zealand ports. With containerisation came new roll-on/roll-off cargo handling methods that require more land adjacent to ships' berths. This resulted in the start of an extension to the Aotea Quay reclamation. Reclamation was carried out on both sides of Queens Wharf and the Wellington Harbour Board Container Terminal was created by a large reclamation at Thorndon.

The first container ship berthed on 19 June 1971. The container terminal has 24.3 hectares of back-up space capable of holding 6,284 containers.

Recent history and present day

After the advent of the Port Reform Act in 1988, the Wellington Harbour Board, along with all other harbour boards, ceased to exist after October 1989. Its commercial, property management and recreational functions were split between the Port of Wellington, Lambton Harbour Management and Wellington City Council respectively.

In 1976, the Historic Places Trust placed 14 plaques along the original shoreline. These plaques run from Pipitea Point, along Lambton Quay, through Mercer Street, lower Cuba Street, Wakefield Street to Oriental Parade at the northern corner of Herd Street.

Timeline of reclamations
From the New Zealand Electronic Text Centre:

See also
Southern Endowment

References

External links
http://www.wellingtonwaterfront.co.nz/history/waterfront_reclamation/
https://nzetc.victoria.ac.nz/etexts/Gov06_07Rail/Gov06_07Rail011a.jpg
https://nzetc.victoria.ac.nz/tm/scholarly/tei-WarEarl-t1-body-d21-d24.html#WarEarl-fig-WarEarl453a
Wellington City Council's Old Shoreline Trail
http://www.nzshipmarine.com/history/companies.aspx?id=11
Wellington Harbour Board Land and Reclamation Act 1883: New Zealand Legislation
The Original One-acre Sections in the — Town of Wellington, and their Purchasers. New Zealand Electronic Text Centre

Wellington Harbour
Coastal engineering
Coastal construction